The 1991–92 Bundesliga was the 29th season of the Bundesliga, Germany's premier football league. It began on 2 August 1991 and ended on 16 May 1992. 1. FC Kaiserslautern were the defending champions.

As Germany had been reunified on 3 October 1990, this was the first season that the Bundesliga contained teams from the former East Germany.

Competition modus
Owing to the incorporation of two teams from former East Germany, the number of clubs was extended to 20, being reduced to the ″traditional″ number of 18 immediately after this one season. Hence, the season consisted of 38 matchdays. Every team played two games against each other team, one at home and one away. Teams received two points for a win and one point for a draw. If two or more teams were tied on points, places were determined by goal difference and, if still tied, by goals scored. The team with the most points were crowned champions while the four teams with the fewest points were relegated to 2. Bundesliga (to be replaced by just two teams from that league).

Team changes to 1990–91
Bayer 05 Uerdingen and Hertha BSC were directly relegated to the 2. Bundesliga after finishing in the last two places. They were replaced by FC Schalke 04 and MSV Duisburg. Uerdingen and Hertha BSC were eventually joined in demotion by relegation/promotion play-off participant FC St. Pauli, who lost on aggregate against Stuttgarter Kickers.

Due to German reunification, teams from the former DDR-Oberliga were also accommodated to the Bundesliga. These were the best two teams of the 1990–91 season, Hansa Rostock and Dynamo Dresden.

Season overview
The season saw some surprises, including Hansa Rostock being at the top of the league table early in the season, and Bayern Munich only finishing mid-table. On the final matchday, three teams had chances to win the Bundesliga title: Eintracht Frankfurt, VfB Stuttgart and Borussia Dortmund each had 50 points before kick-off, and all three had an away match to play. Frankfurt seemed to have the easiest task, but lost 1–2 to Rostock and only finished third. They were overtaken by Stuttgart who won 2–1 at Bayer Leverkusen and achieved their 4th German championship. Dortmund won 1–0 at MSV Duisburg and finished second.

Despite their 2–1 win, Rostock were relegated, along with Fortuna Düsseldorf, Duisburg and Stuttgarter Kickers. Out of the teams that had been promoted from Bundesliga Two, FC Schalke 04 were the only one to stay in the league. Dynamo Dresden remained as the only team from Eastern Germany.

Team overview

League table

Results

Top goalscorers
22 goals
  Fritz Walter (VfB Stuttgart)

20 goals
  Stéphane Chapuisat (Borussia Dortmund)

17 goals
  Roland Wohlfarth (FC Bayern Munich)

15 goals
  Anthony Yeboah (Eintracht Frankfurt)

14 goals
  Lothar Sippel (Eintracht Frankfurt)

13 goals
  Marcus Marin (Stuttgarter Kickers)
  Michael Spies (Hansa Rostock)
  Michael Tönnies (MSV Duisburg)

12 goals
  Marco Bode (SV Werder Bremen)
  Dieter Eckstein (1. FC Nürnberg)
  Ulf Kirsten (Bayer 04 Leverkusen)
  Andreas Möller (Eintracht Frankfurt)
  Dimitrios Moutas (Stuttgarter Kickers)

Champion squad

See also
 1991–92 2. Bundesliga
 1991–92 DFB-Pokal

References

External links
 DFB Bundesliga archive 1991/1992

Bundesliga seasons
1
Germany